Samuel Sheffield Snow (1806–1890) was a skeptic turned Millerite preacher who calculated that the return of Christ was to take place on October 22, 1844. His teaching sparked what became known as the "Seventh-Day movement," which led to the Great Disappointment when Jesus did not return as expected.

Biography

Millerism
Until the age of 35, Snow had been "a settled unbeliever in the Bible." He had even worked as an agent for the Boston Investigator, an avowedly atheistic newspaper. He was converted to Christianity in 1839, as a result of reading a copy of William Miller's lectures that his brother had bought.

After his conversion, he joined a Congregational Church in 1840. In 1842, at a Millerite camp meeting (see also: Seventh-day Adventist camp meetings) in East Kingston, New Hampshire, he devoted himself to preaching the Millerite message full-time.

See also

 Adventism
 Great Disappointment

References

External links
Samuel Snow on Find a Grave  

1806 births
1870 deaths
19th-century apocalypticists
Adventism
Millerites